Renhuai is a county-level city located in the north of Guizhou province, China, bordering Sichuan province to the west. It is under the administration of the prefecture-level city of Zunyi. The city is served by Zunyi Maotai Airport.

Administrative divisions
 Under the jurisdiction of Renhuai, it is subdivided into 19 township-level divisions (13 towns and 6 townships); subdivided into 22 communities and 149 villages.

Climate

References 

 
County-level divisions of Guizhou
Zunyi